Dick Herman Jacobus de Jongh (born 19 October 1939, Enschede) is a Dutch logician and mathematician and a retired professor at the University of Amsterdam.
He received his PhD degree in 1968 from the University of Wisconsin–Madison under supervision of Stephen Kleene with a dissertation entitled Investigations on the Intuitionistic Propositional Calculus. De Jongh is mostly known for his work on proof theory, provability logic and intuitionistic logic. De Jongh is a member of the group collectively publishing under the pseudonym L. T. F. Gamut. In 2004, on the occasion of his retirement, the Institute for Logic, Language and Computation at the University of Amsterdam published a festschrift in his honor.

References

Curriculum vitae

External links
Web page at the University of Amsterdam

1939 births
Living people
20th-century Dutch mathematicians
Dutch logicians
Leiden University alumni
University of Amsterdam alumni
University of Wisconsin–Madison alumni
Academic staff of the University of Amsterdam
Proof theorists
20th-century Dutch philosophers
People from Enschede